Barrett's Britz Building is a historic commercial building located in downtown Evansville, Indiana. It was built in 1875, and is a three-story, Italianate style brick building.  It features a decorative cornice and window surrounds.

It was listed on the National Register of Historic Places in 1984.

References

Commercial buildings on the National Register of Historic Places in Indiana
Italianate architecture in Indiana
Commercial buildings completed in 1875
Buildings and structures in Evansville, Indiana
National Register of Historic Places in Evansville, Indiana